The Fort McDermitt Paiute and Shoshone Tribe is a federally recognized tribe of Northern Paiute and Western Shoshone peoples, whose reservation Fort McDermitt Paiute and Shoshone Tribes of the Fort McDermitt Indian Reservation spans the Nevada and Oregon border next to Idaho.

Peoples from these two tribes have historically also lived in what is now defined as southwestern Idaho. They are close culturally and linguistically to the Bannock people and various other Shoshone-language peoples. Peoples of these tribes are members of other federally recognized tribes in Nevada and Idaho.

In October 2016 a federal law was passed to put approximately 19,094 acres of Bureau of Land Management (BLM) land into trust for the Tribe in order to expand their reservation; this was done under the Nevada Native Nations Land Act. Gaming is prohibited on the new lands.

Reservation

The Fort McDermitt Indian Reservation spans the distance of the Nevada–Oregon border, in Humboldt County, Nevada and Malheur County, Oregon, near the Quinn River, which runs east to west through the Tribe's Nevada lands. Just to the east is southwestern Idaho. The Fort McDermitt Military Reservation was established 14 August 1865 at the former site of Quinn River Camp No. 33 and a stagecoach stop, Quinn River Station, in what was a traditional seasonal homeland of the Paiute, Shoshone and Bannock peoples.

In October 2016 the federal government put into trust for the tribe approximately  acres of Bureau of Land Management (BLM) land in Nevada, in order to expand their reservation and give them a more sustainable base. Gaming is prohibited on these new lands. This was done under the Nevada Native Nations Land Act (PL No: 114-232).

History 
Originally the fort was established to protect the stagecoach route from Virginia City through Winnemucca, Nevada to Silver City, Idaho Territory, in the southwestern part of the area. It was named after Lt. Col. Charles McDermit, commander of the Military District of Nevada, who was killed in a skirmish in the area in 1865.

The Paiute had traditional territory ranging from the Southwest up into Nevada, Oregon and southwestern Idaho. The Paiute in this area became known as the "Northern Paiute." They are related culturally and linguistically to the Shoshone, Bannock and other tribes of the region.

When the military outpost was closed in 1889, the Military Reservation was adapted as the Fort McDermitt Indian Agency. Northern Paiute and Shoshone were settled here. In 1936 the federal government established an Indian reservation to support the tribe's organizing as the Paiute and Shoshone Tribe under the Indian Reorganization Act of 1934. They had to give up their traditional, hereditary chiefs as leaders in favor of an elected, representative form of government.

Government
The Tribes drafted a Constitution and Bylaws (which were approved after changes by the US Bureau of Indian Affairs). It also had a Corporate Charter (drafted by the federal government and containing provisions not required by the Indian Reorganization Act of 1934.) On 6 May 1936 the new Constitution, ByLaws and Corporate Charter was approved by 54 of 65 available voters.

The government has an elected chairman and an elected eight-member Tribal Council, including a vice chairman.

As at the 2010 census, 313 Native Americans lived on the reservation, with 42 enrolled members living in nearby McDermitt, Oregon. More tribal members than "enrolled" tribal members live on the Reservation. The Tribe's Constitution and laws have some conflicting definitions of tribal members.

The Constitution defines tribal members as: 
the "original allottees in 1936, 
[at birth] such of their descendants [who] maintain a bona-fide residence on the [Reservation]", and 
Tribe" (see Constitution and ByLaws, Article II, Section 1(a), (b))). Thus the people do not need to be enrolled citizens to be considered members.

The Constitution and ByLaws allow the Tribal Council to enroll two classes of People; see id., Article II, Section 2(a),(b). The confusion was created in the 1980s. At a time when Northern Paiute land claims funds were about to be disbursed, federal officials suggested that the Tribal Council enact an "Enrollment Ordinance" to define membership qualifications of the Tribe and noted that only the council had authority to do this. The ordinance did not address conflicts with standing definitions of members, as noted above (and in Article II, Section 1(a) and (b)).

Language

The tribe speaks the Northern Paiute language, also known as Paviotso, which is a Western Numic language. Fort McDermitt has the greatest concentration of Northern Paiute speakers among the various locations where they live. 20–30% of the tribe's children can speak the language.

Communities
Fort McDermitt, Nevada

Notable tribal members and residents
 Sarah Winnemucca
 Chief Winnemucca, also known as Old Winnemucca, Sarah's father and a war leader

References

Further reading
 Pritzker Barry M. A Native American Encyclopedia: History, Culture, and Peoples, Oxford: Oxford University Press, 2000. 
 Constitution and By-Laws of the Fort McDermitt Paiute and Shoshone Tribe
 R. Eagleye Johnny, "Can Indian Tribes Afford to Let the Bureau of Indian Affairs Continue to Negotiate Permits & Leases of Their Resources?", American Indian Law Review 16(1): 201–211 (University of Oklahoma, Norman, 1991)
 Erickson, J.D., Chapman D. and R. Eagleye Johnny, "Monitored Retrievable Storage of Spent Nuclear Fuel in Indian Country: Liability, Sovereignty, and Socioeconomics," American Indian Law Review 19(1): 73–103 (University of Oklahoma, Norman, 1994)

Northern Paiute
Western Shoshone
American Indian reservations in Nevada
American Indian reservations in Oregon
Geography of Humboldt County, Nevada
Geography of Malheur County, Oregon
Native American tribes in Nevada
Native American tribes in Oregon
Federally recognized tribes in the United States